K 92 may refer to:

K-92 (Kansas highway), highway in Kansas

Also the moniker of at least three radio stations in the U.S.:

WXLK-FM 92.3 FM in Roanoke, Virginia (Top 40)
WWKA also 92.3 FM in Orlando, Florida (Country) 
KWSC 91.9 FM  in Wayne, Nebraska (Wayne State College)